Charles Eliot may refer to:
Charles William Eliot (1834–1926), American academic; president of Harvard (1869–1909)
Charles Eliot (landscape architect) (1859–1897), American landscape architect
Sir Charles Eliot (diplomat) (1862–1931), British diplomat and colonial administrator 
Charles William John Eliot (1928–2008), Canadian academic and university administrator

See also 

Charles Elliot (1801–1875), first British administrator of Hong Kong
Charles Elliot (1818–1895), British admiral
Charles Elliott (disambiguation)